MYC proto-oncogene, bHLH transcription factor is a protein that in humans is encoded by the MYC gene which is a member of the myc family of transcription factors. The protein contains basic helix-loop-helix (bHLH) structural motif.

Function

This gene is a proto-oncogene and encodes a nuclear phosphoprotein that plays a role in cell cycle progression, apoptosis and cellular transformation. The encoded protein forms a heterodimer with the related transcription factor MAX. This complex binds to the E box DNA consensus sequence and regulates the transcription of specific target genes. Amplification of this gene is frequently observed in numerous human cancers. Translocations involving this gene are associated with Burkitt lymphoma and multiple myeloma in human patients. There is evidence to show that translation initiates both from an upstream, in-frame non-AUG (CUG) and a downstream AUG start site, resulting in the production of two isoforms with distinct N-termini. [provided by RefSeq, Aug 2017].

As a drug target 

Under normal circumstances, c-Myc through its bHLHZip domain heterodimerizes with other transcription factors such as MAD, MAX, and MNT. Myc/Max dimers activate gene transcription, while Mad/Max and Mnt/Max dimers inhibit the activity of Myc. c-MYC is over expressed in the majority of human cancers and in cancers where it is over expressed, it drives proliferation of cancer cells.

A recombinant form of c-Myc called Omomyc in which four residues are mutated has been produced. Omomyc heterodimers with c-Myc and inhibits c-Myc transcriptional activity.  When the mouse cancer cell line NIH3T3 is treated with Omomyc, it inhibits proliferation.  In a mouse model of cancer in which cancer cells were genetically engineered to conditionally express Omomyc, Omomyc triggered tumor regression which was accompanied by reduced proliferation and increased apoptosis of the tumor tissue.

The Omomyc displays high affinity for MAX (Myc-associated protein X) and for enhancer box element CACGTG DNA sequences, that result in the uncoupling of cellular proliferation from normal growth factor regulation and contribute to many of the phenotypic hallmarks of cancer. Omomyc also can bind MYC monomers and prevent it entering the nucleus.

The recombinantly produced Omomyc miniprotein has been developed as a drug (OMO-103) and is currently in clinical trials.

References

Further reading 

Oncogenes
Transcription factors